In geometry, the trihexagonal tiling is one of 11 uniform tilings of the Euclidean plane by regular polygons. It consists of equilateral triangles and regular hexagons, arranged so that each hexagon is surrounded by triangles and vice versa. The name derives from the fact that it combines a regular hexagonal tiling and a regular triangular tiling. Two hexagons and two triangles alternate around each vertex, and its edges form an infinite arrangement of lines. Its dual is the rhombille tiling.

This pattern, and its place in the classification of uniform tilings, was already known to Johannes Kepler in his 1619 book Harmonices Mundi. The pattern has long been used in Japanese basketry, where it is called kagome. The Japanese term for this pattern has been taken up in physics, where it is called a kagome lattice. It occurs also in the crystal structures of certain minerals. Conway calls it a hexadeltille, combining alternate elements from a hexagonal tiling (hextille) and triangular tiling (deltille).

Kagome 

Kagome is a traditional Japanese woven bamboo pattern; its name is composed from the words kago, meaning "basket", and me, meaning "eye(s)", referring to the pattern of holes in a woven basket.

The kagome pattern is common in bamboo weaving in East Asia. In 2022, archaeologists found bamboo weaving remains at the Dongsunba ruins in Chongqing, China, 200 BC. After 2200 years, the kagome pattern is still clear.

It is a woven arrangement of laths composed of interlaced triangles such that each point where two laths cross has four neighboring points, forming the pattern of a trihexagonal tiling. The woven process gives the Kagome a chiral wallpaper group symmetry, p6, (632).

Kagome lattice
The term kagome lattice was coined by Japanese physicist Kôdi Husimi, and first appeared in a 1951 paper by his assistant Ichirō Shōji.
The kagome lattice in this sense consists of the vertices and edges of the trihexagonal tiling.
Despite the name, these crossing points do not form a mathematical lattice.

A related three dimensional structure formed by the vertices and edges of the quarter cubic honeycomb, filling space by regular tetrahedra and truncated tetrahedra, has been called a hyper-kagome lattice. It is represented by the vertices and edges of the quarter cubic honeycomb, filling space by regular tetrahedra and truncated tetrahedra. It contains four sets of parallel planes of points and lines, each plane being a two dimensional kagome lattice. A second expression in three dimensions has parallel layers of two dimensional lattices and is called an orthorhombic-kagome lattice. The trihexagonal prismatic honeycomb represents its edges and vertices.

Some minerals, namely jarosites and herbertsmithite, contain two-dimensional layers or three-dimensional kagome lattice arrangement of atoms in their crystal structure. These minerals display novel physical properties connected with geometrically frustrated magnetism. For instance, the spin arrangement of the magnetic ions in Co3V2O8 rests in a kagome lattice which exhibits fascinating magnetic behavior at low temperatures. Quantum magnets realized on Kagome metals have been discovered to exhibit many unexpected electronic and magnetic phenomena. It is also proposed that SYK behavior can be observed in two dimensional kagome lattice with impurities.

The term is much in use nowadays in the scientific literature, especially by theorists studying the magnetic properties of a theoretical kagome lattice.

See also:  Kagome crests.

Symmetry

The trihexagonal tiling has Schläfli symbol of r{6,3}, or Coxeter diagram, symbolizing the fact that it is a rectified hexagonal tiling, {6,3}. Its symmetries can be described by the wallpaper group p6mm, (*632), and the tiling can be derived as a Wythoff construction within the reflectional fundamental domains of this group.  The trihexagonal tiling is a quasiregular tiling, alternating two types of polygons, with vertex configuration (3.6)2. It is also a uniform tiling, one of eight derived from the regular hexagonal tiling.

Uniform colorings 
There are two distinct uniform colorings of a trihexagonal tiling. Naming the colors by indices on the 4 faces around a vertex (3.6.3.6): 1212, 1232. The second is called a cantic hexagonal tiling, h2{6,3}, with two colors of triangles, existing in p3m1 (*333) symmetry.

Circle packing 
The trihexagonal tiling  can be used as a circle packing, placing equal diameter circles at the center of every point. Every circle is in contact with 4 other circles in the packing (kissing number).

Topologically equivalent tilings
The trihexagonal tiling can be geometrically distorted into topologically equivalent tilings of lower symmetry. In these variants of the tiling, the edges do not necessarily line up to form straight lines.

Related quasiregular tilings
The trihexagonal tiling exists in a sequence of symmetries of quasiregular tilings with vertex configurations (3.n)2, progressing from tilings of the sphere to the Euclidean plane and into the hyperbolic plane. With orbifold notation symmetry of *n32 all of these tilings are wythoff construction within a fundamental domain of symmetry, with generator points at the right angle corner of the domain.

Related regular complex apeirogons 

There are 2 regular complex apeirogons, sharing the vertices of the trihexagonal tiling. Regular complex apeirogons have vertices and edges, where edges can contain 2 or more vertices. Regular apeirogons p{q}r are constrained by: 1/p + 2/q + 1/r = 1. Edges have p vertices arranged like a regular polygon, and vertex figures are r-gonal.

The first is made of triangular edges, two around every vertex, second has hexagonal edges, two around every vertex.

See also 

 Percolation threshold
 Kagome crest
 Star of David
 Trihexagonal prismatic honeycomb
 Cyclotruncated simplectic honeycomb
 List of uniform tilings

References

Further reading
 

Euclidean tilings
Isogonal tilings
Isotoxal tilings
Semiregular tilings
Quasiregular polyhedra
Japanese bamboowork
Crystallography